Silverdome most often refers to the Pontiac Silverdome, an American stadium formerly home to the Detroit Lions and Pistons.  It may also refer to:
 Silverdome (Launceston) a sporting and entertainment venue in Launceston, Tasmania, Australia
 PWA Silverdome in Zoetermeer, The Netherlands